There are two species of lizard named Cape snake lizard:

 Chamaesaura anguina
 Chamaesaura tenuior